John Richard Junkin (December 16, 1896 – October 12, 1975) was an American farmer and politician who served as Speaker of the Mississippi House of Representatives from 1966 until his death from cancer in 1975. He was previously chairman of the House appropriations committee.

References

External links
 

1896 births
1975 deaths
Members of the Mississippi House of Representatives
Speakers of the Mississippi House of Representatives
20th-century American politicians